Kamosu Jinja's honden and a granary at Toro
 is an ancient Japanese architectural   style and the oldest Shinto shrine architectural style. Named after Izumo Taisha's honden (sanctuary), like Ise Grand Shrine's shinmei-zukuri style it features a bark roof decorated with poles called chigi and katsuogi, plus archaic features like gable-end pillars and a single central pillar (shin no mihashira). The honden's floor is raised above the ground through the use of stilts (see photo).
Like the shinmei-zukuri and sumiyoshi-zukuri styles, it predates the arrival of Buddhism in Japan.

History
Ancient shrines were constructed according to the style of dwellings (Izumo Taisha) or storehouses (Ise Grand Shrine). The buildings had gabled roofs, raised floors, plank walls, and were thatched with reed or covered with hinoki cypress bark. Such early shrines did not include a space for worship. Three important forms of ancient shrine architectural styles exist: taisha-zukuri, shinmei-zukuri and sumiyoshi-zukuri. They are exemplified by Izumo Taisha, Nishina Shinmei Shrine and Sumiyoshi Taisha respectively and date to before 552. According to the tradition of {{nihongo|Shikinen sengū-sai|式年遷宮祭}}, the buildings or shrines were faithfully rebuilt at regular intervals adhering to the original design. In this manner, ancient styles have been replicated through the centuries to the present day.

Structure

Izumo Taisha's honden over time has gone through profound changes that have greatly decreased its size and changed its structure. In its present form, it is a gabled building 2x2 ken in size, with an entrance on the gabled end (a characteristic called . Like Ise Grand Shrine's, it has purely ornamental poles called chigi (vertical) and katsuogi (horizontal) on a cypress bark-covered roof, plus archaic features like gable-end pillars and a single central pillar. This pillar has a diameter of 10.9 cm, has no obvious structural role and is believed to have had a purely religious significance. The external stairway is covered by an independent bark-covered roof (see illustration in the gallery). 

The honden's interior is a square divided into four identical sections, each covered by fifteen tatami (straw mats).

Because its floor is raised above the ground, the honden is believed to have its origin in raised-floor granaries like those found in Toro, Shizuoka prefecture.

The oldest extant example of taisha-zukuri is the honden at Kamosu Shrine in Matsue, Shimane prefecture, built in 1582 and now declared a National Treasure. Smaller than Izumo Taisha's, it nonetheless has thick supporting pillars. It is deeper, has a higher floor, and differs significantly from Izumo Taisha's. It probably represents an older style of construction.

Gallery

Notes

References
History and Typology of Shrine Architecture, Encyclopedia of Shinto accessed on November 29, 2009

,

Shinto architecture
Izumo Grand Shrine